Giovanni Battista Antici (17 July 1631 – 17 July 1690) was a Roman Catholic prelate who served as Bishop of Amelia from 1685 to 1690.

Biography
Giovanni Battista Antici was born in Recanati, Italy, on 17 July 1631 and ordained a priest on 6 April 1658.

On 9 April 1685, he was appointed during the papacy of Pope Innocent XI as Bishop of Amelia. On 23 April 1685, he was consecrated bishop by Alessandro Crescenzi, Cardinal-Priest of Santa Prisca, with Diego Petra, Archbishop of Sorrento, and Pier Antonio Capobianco, Bishop Emeritus of Lacedonia, serving as co-consecrators.

He served as Bishop of Amelia until his death on 17 July 1690.

See also 
Catholic Church in Italy

References

External links and additional sources
 (for Chronology of Bishops) 
 (for Chronology of Bishops) 

17th-century Italian Roman Catholic bishops
Bishops appointed by Pope Innocent XI
1631 births
1690 deaths